Douglas Lee Miller (December 31, 1949 – February 5, 2021) was an American gospel musician. He started his music career, in 1984, with the release of, I Still Love the Name Jesus, that was released by Atlanta International Records. This album along with five others placed on exclusively the Billboard magazine Gospel Albums chart. He released albums with A&M Records, Light Records, Word Records, Atlanta International Records, and Rejoice Music Group.

Early life
Miller was born on December 31, 1949, in Johnstown, Pennsylvania as Douglas Lee Miller, and was reared in the church singing in the choir. He went to the University of Akron, and while there at the college, Mattie Moss Clark trained him how to hone his craft, and presented him at Midnight Musicals put on by The Church of God in Christ. He became known for his baritone timbre.

Music career
He started his recording music career in 1984, with the release of I Still Love the Name of Jesus by Atlanta International Records, and it placed at No. 5 on the Billboard magazine Gospel Albums chart. He would place five more albums upon that chart, with 1985's Unspeakable Joy at No. 6, while 1985's Redeeming Love peaked at No. 22, the next 1988's Sing until Morning went to No. 14 as did 1993's Victory, and 1990s Living at the Top got to No. 15.

Discography

References

External links
 Cross Rhythms artist profile
 

1949 births
2021 deaths
People from Johnstown, Pennsylvania
African-American songwriters
African-American Christians
Musicians from Pennsylvania
Musicians from Ohio
Songwriters from Pennsylvania
Songwriters from Ohio
A&M Records artists
Word Records artists
20th-century African-American people
21st-century African-American people